Michael Haneke (born 23 March 1942) is an Austrian film director and screenwriter. His work often examines social issues and depicts the feelings of estrangement experienced by individuals in modern society. Haneke has made films in French, German, and English and has worked in television and theatre, as well as cinema. He also teaches film direction at the Film Academy Vienna.

His directorial debut, The Seventh Continent, won the Bronze Leopard at the Locarno International Film Festival in 1989. He later won the Grand Prix at the 2001 Cannes Film Festival for The Piano Teacher and the Best Director Award for Caché at the 2005 Cannes Film Festival. He subsequently directed the 2007 remake of his controversial 1997 film Funny Games.

At the 2009 Cannes Film Festival, his film The White Ribbon won the Palme d'Or, and at the 67th Golden Globe Awards the film won the Golden Globe Award for Best Foreign Language Film. In 2012, his film Amour premiered and competed at the 2012 Cannes Film Festival. The film would go on to win the Palme d'Or, making it his second win of the prestigious award in three years; this made him the seventh director to have won it twice and the only Austrian director to have accomplished this. The film received five Academy Award nominations, including Best Picture, Best Director, Best Original Screenplay, and Best Actress in a Leading Role for Emmanuelle Riva; it won in the category of Best Foreign Language Film.

In 2013, Haneke won the Prince of Asturias Award for the arts. His twelfth and most recent film, Happy End, was nominated for the Palme d'Or at the 2017 Cannes Film Festival.

Life and career
Haneke is the son of German actor and director Fritz Haneke and Austrian actress . His stepfather, the composer , had later married the mother of actor Christoph Waltz. Haneke was raised in the city of Wiener Neustadt, Austria.

Haneke showed a strong interest in literature and music, but as an adolescent developed a "downright contempt for any form of school". During this period of his life, he has later described himself as a "rebel". He had ambitions of becoming an actor in his youth, later abandoning these plans after failing an entrance examination at the Max Reinhardt Seminar in Vienna. He later attended the University of Vienna to study philosophy, psychology and drama. Not a committed student, he would spend most of his time attending local movie theatres. After leaving university, he began working odd jobs, before working as an editor and dramaturge at the southwestern German television station Südwestfunk from 1967 to 1970, a time during which he also worked as a film critic. He made his debut as a television director in 1974.

Haneke's feature film debut was 1989's The Seventh Continent, which served to trace out the violent and bold style that would bloom in later years. Three years later, the controversial Benny's Video put Haneke's name on the map. Haneke achieved great success in 2001 with the critically successful French film The Piano Teacher. It won the prestigious Grand Prize at the 2001 Cannes Film Festival and also won its stars, Benoît Magimel and Isabelle Huppert, the Best Actor and Actress awards. He has worked with Juliette Binoche (Code Unknown in 2000 and Caché in 2005), after she expressed interest in working with him. Haneke frequently worked with real-life couple Ulrich Mühe and Susanne Lothar – thrice each.

His film, The White Ribbon, premiered at the 2009 Cannes Film Festival and won the Palme d'Or. The film is set in 1913 and deals with strange incidents in a small town in Northern Germany, depicting an authoritarian, fascist-like atmosphere, where children are subjected to rigid rules and suffer harsh punishments, and where strange deaths occur. In 2012, his film Amour also won the Palme d'Or.

Haneke says that films should offer viewers more space for imagination and self-reflection. Films that have too much detail and moral clarity, Haneke says, are used for mindless consumption by their viewers.

His 2012 film Amour won the Best Foreign Language Oscar and was nominated for the Best Picture Oscar at the 85th Academy Awards. In 2013, he was the subject of the documentary film Michael H – Profession: Director. That year, Haneke won the Prince of Asturias Award for the arts.

In 2017, his twelfth film, Happy End, was nominated for the Palme d'Or at the 70th Cannes Film Festival.

Haneke also teaches film direction at the Film Academy Vienna. One of his students there was director Katharina Mückstein.

Stage work
Haneke has directed a number of stage productions in German, which include works by Strindberg, Goethe, and Heinrich von Kleist in Berlin, Munich and Vienna. In 2006 he gave his debut as an opera director, staging Mozart's Don Giovanni for the Opéra National de Paris at Palais Garnier when the theater's general manager was Gerard Mortier. In 2012, he was to direct Così fan tutte for the New York City Opera. This production had originally been commissioned by Jürgen Flimm for the Salzburg Festival 2009, but Haneke had to resign due to an illness preventing him from preparing the work. Haneke realized this production at Madrid's Teatro Real in 2013.

Filmography

Feature films

Television

Short films
 Lumière and Company (1995) (segment "Michael Haneke/Vienne")

Bibliography
 Catherine Wheatley: Michael Haneke's Cinema: The Ethic of the Image, New York: Berghahn Books, 2009,  review
 Michael Haneke. Special Issue of Modern Austrian Literature. 43.2, 2010.
 Alexander D. Ornella / Stefanie Knauss (ed.): Fascinatingly Disturbing. Interdisciplinary Perspectives on Michael Haneke's Cinema, Eugene, Pickwick, 2010, .
A Companion to Michael Haneke. Germany: Wiley, 2010.
Fatima Naqvi, Trügerische Vertrautheit: Filme von Michael Haneke/ Deceptive Familiarity: Films by Michael Haneke, Synema, Wien, 2010.
Wheatley, Catherine. Michael Haneke's Cinema: The Ethic of the Image. United Kingdom: Berghahn Books, 2013.
Grundmann, Roy, Fatima Naqvi, and Colin Root. Michael Haneke: Interviews. University Press of Mississippi, Jackson, 2020.

References

External links

 
 
 

1942 births
Living people
Austrian film critics
Austrian film directors
Austrian opera directors
Austrian television directors
Austrian theatre directors
Austrian screenwriters
Best Director César Award winners
Best Director German Film Award winners
Cannes Film Festival Award for Best Director winners
Directors of Best Foreign Language Film Academy Award winners
Directors of Palme d'Or winners
European Film Award for Best Director winners
European Film Award for Best Screenwriter winners
Filmmakers who won the Best Foreign Language Film BAFTA Award
Film directors from Munich
French-language film directors
Knights Commander of the Order of Merit of the Federal Republic of Germany
Georges Delerue Award winners
Austrian male screenwriters
Members of the Academy of Arts, Berlin
People from Wiener Neustadt
Recipients of the Pour le Mérite (civil class)
University of Vienna alumni